The United States competed at the 1920 Summer Olympics in Antwerp, Belgium. 288 competitors, 274 men and 14 women, took part in 113 events in 18 sports.

Medalists

Aquatics

Diving

Fourteen divers, seven men and seven women, represented the United States in 1920. It was the nation's fourth appearance in the sport; the United States was the only nation to have competed at each Olympic diving contest to that point. The Americans won their first gold medals in the sport since 1904, winning championships in three of the five diving events in 1920. The team swept both the men's and women's springboard events (though only Americans competed in the women's springboard), and added a gold and a bronze in the men's platform. Pinkston was the only diver from any nation in 1920 to win multiple medals.

 Men

Ranks given are within the semifinal group.

 Women

Ranks given are within the semifinal group.

Swimming

Twenty-two swimmers, sixteen men and six women, represented the United States in 1920. It was the nation's sixth appearance in the sport; the United States was the only nation to have competed in every Olympic swimming edition to that point. The Americans took eight of the ten gold medals, along with five silvers and three bronzes. This gave the team more than half of the available medals—16 out of 30; more than three times the next-best country. Eleven different Americans finished with at least one medal. The United States set five new world records and tied another.

Kahanamoku set a new Olympic record in the quarterfinals of the 100 free, then tied the world record twice in the semis and the final as the Americans swept the medals in that event. Ross took a pair of gold medals in the other two freestyle events. Kegeris briefly took the Olympic record in the 100 metre backstroke semifinals before Warren Kealoha broke the world record in the second semifinal; Kealoha took gold and Kegeris silver in the final. The relay team also set a world record in winning the gold medal.

Schroth, like Kegeris, briefly held an Olympic record in the 100 free before Bleibtrey broke the world record in a later semifinal. Bleibtrey bettered her own new record, leading the American women to a sweep of the medals in that event. Bleibtrey took her second world record and second gold medal in the 300 free, as the Americans swept that event as well. Her third gold medal and third world record came as part of the 4x100 free relay team along with Schroth, Guest, and Woodbridge.

Ranks given are within the heat.

 Men

 Women

Water polo

The United States competed in the Olympic water polo tournament for the second time in 1920. The Bergvall System was in use at the time. The Americans shut out Greece in the quarterfinals, advancing to the semifinals. They were defeated there by a dominant Great Britain side, which went on to win the gold medal. This gave the United States an opportunity to play for the silver under the Bergvall System. In the silver medal semifinals, they shut out Spain, but were again stymied in a loss to Belgium in the silver medal match. With one last chance at a medal, the Americans again defeated Greece in the bronze medal semifinals. In the bronze medal match, however, the team was shut out by Sweden.

 Quarterfinals

 Semifinals

 Silver medal semifinals

 Silver medal match

 Bronze medal semifinals

 Bronze medal match

 Final rank 4th

Athletics

90 athletes represented the United States in 1920. It was the sixth appearance of the nation in athletics, a sport in which the United States had competed at every Games. The American team, used to dominance of the sport, was seriously challenged for the first time. The nine gold medals won by the team tied the mark for fewest the nation had ever won, matching the 1896 total (when only 12 events, rather than 29, were contested). Finland matched the United States gold medal for gold medal, the first time any other nation had done so and the last time until the 1972 Games. The depth of the American team allowed the team to collect twelve silver and eight bronze medals as well (the United States's 29 total medals nearly doubled the 16 of Finland), allowing the team to remain on top of the athletics medals leader board yet again.

Ranks given are within the heat.

Boxing

16 boxers represented the United States at the 1920 Games. It was the nation's second appearance in boxing. The American team was one of two to send the maximum number of boxers, two in each weight class, along with Great Britain. The Americans' three gold medals was the best of any nation, but their four total medals was only the third most.

Cycling

Nine cyclists represented the United States in 1920. It was the nation's fifth appearance in the sport. Taylor's semifinal qualification in the sprint was the best result on the cycling track for the Americans, with Kockler's 13th-place finish in the individual time trial the best American result in road cycling, leading the American road cyclists to a 7th place team total.

Road cycling

Track cycling

Ranks given are within the heat.

Equestrian

Eight equestrians represented the United States in 1920. It was the nation's third appearance in the sport, having been one of three countries (along with Belgium and France) to have appeared at every Olympic equestrian competition to that point. The Americans earned no medals in 1920, unable to add to the bronze won in 1912. The team's best individual result was Chamberlin's sixth place in the eventing; the eventing team took fourth place. In a somewhat unusual result, all three of the American dressage competitors earned exactly the same score.

Fencing

Nineteen fencers represented the United States in 1920. It was the nation's fourth appearance in the sport. The Americans won a single medal, the bronze in the team foil. It was the country's first fencing medal since hosting the Games in 1904. None of the individual fencers reached an event final, though both teams which had to compete in semifinals did advance.

Ranks given are within the group.

Gymnastics

Four gymnasts represented the United States in 1920. It was the nation's second appearance in the sport, and first since hosting the Games in 1904.

Artistic gymnastics

Ice hockey

The United States competed in the inaugural Olympic ice hockey tournament. The team cruised through its quarterfinal, beating Switzerland 29–0. The Americans met Canada in a semifinal matchup; the two were clearly the best teams in the tournament. Canada came out the better, winning 2–0 to send the United States into the silver medal tournament. There, the Americans beat Sweden and Czechoslovakia by a combined score of 23–0 to emerge winners of the silver medal, using the Bergvall System.

 Roster
Coach:  Cornelius Fellowes

 Gold medal Quarterfinals

 Gold medal semifinals

 Silver medal semifinals

 Silver medal match

Final rank  Silver

Modern pentathlon

Two pentathletes represented the United States in 1920. It was the nation's second appearance in the sport, having competed at both instances of the Olympic modern pentathlon.

A point-for-place system was used, with the lowest total score winning.

Polo

The United States competed in the Olympic polo tournament for the second time. The team took the bronze medal, losing to Spain in the semifinals but defeating Belgium in the bronze medal match.

 Semifinals

 Final

 Final rank  Bronze

Rowing

Fifteen rowers represented the United States in 1920. It was the nation's third appearance in the sport. Three of the four boats took gold medals, with the fourth having to settle for silver after a 4-second loss to Switzerland in the coxed fours final.

Ranks given are within the heat.

Rugby union

The United States competed in the Olympic rugby tournament for the first time. They faced France in the only match of the tournament, as the two countries were the only ones to compete. The Americans won the match to take the gold medal.

 Final

Final rank  Gold

Skating

Figure skating

Two figure skaters represented the United States in 1920. It was the nation's second appearance in the sport; Sweden was one of three countries to compete in both Summer Olympics figure skating competitions. Weld took the bronze medal in the ladies' singles, with Niles finishing sixth in the men's. The two took fourth place in the pairs competition.

Shooting

Twenty-nine shooters represented the United States in 1920. It was the nation's fourth appearance in the sport. The country took 13 of 21 gold medals, won at least one medal in 18 of the 21 events, and finished with 23 medals—more than twice Norway's 11, which was second-best. The American teams took gold medals in 8 of the 11 team events, with a silver, a bronze, and a fourth-place finish rounding out its team results. In individual competitions, the United States won five golds, three silvers, and five bronzes. Twelve men won individual medals (Nuesslein was the only American shooter to win multiple individual medals), and ten more received medals as parts of teams.

They swept the individual small-bore rifle medals, as well as taking the gold medal in the team event. They repeated this performance in the trap and team clay pigeons events.

The American shooters won both the individual and team golds in the free rifle.

The team took both team pistol golds, as well as one of two individual pistol golds.

The military rifle events gave the United States more trouble; the team won no medal in the individual 300 metre prone event, and took only silver in the team 300 metre standing competition.

The running deer was by far the worst category for the Americans; of the four events, the United States took only a single bronze medal in the team single shots event.

Tug of war

The United States competed in the Olympic tug of war tournament for the third time in 1920, the final appearance of the sport in the Olympics. The Americans joined the British in tying Sweden's mark for most appearances in the short life of tug of war at the Olympics at three of five.

The Bergvall System was used in 1920. The Americans lost in the quarterfinals to eventual gold-medallist Great Britain, thus putting the United States in contention for the silver medal. In the silver medal semifinals, they were defeated by Belgium. They won their first match of the tournament in the bronze medal semifinals, defeating Italy, before again losing to Belgium in the bronze medal match. The United States finished in fourth place of the five teams.

All matches were best-of-three pulls.

 Quarterfinals

 Silver medal semifinals

 Bronze medal semifinals

 Bronze medal match

 Final rank 4th

Wrestling

Eighteen wrestlers competed for the United States in 1920, tying Finland for most wrestlers that year. It was the nation's fourth appearance in the sport, matching Great Britain for most to that point. The American wrestlers took six medals, including one gold medal, and finished third on the medals leaderboard, behind Finland with five golds and Sweden with three golds. Ackerly was the American gold medalist, finishing 1–2 with Gerson in the freestyle featherweight. Metropoulos and Pendleton competed in both freestyle and Greco-Roman events, as the United States entered two wrestlers in each weight class. Most of the American success came in the freestyle competitions, with all six medals coming in that discipline.

Freestyle

Greco-Roman

See also
 Mutiny of the Matoika, an account of travel by the U.S. Olympic team to the 1920 Summer Olympics

References

External links
 
 
International Olympic Committee results database

Nations at the 1920 Summer Olympics
1920
Olympics